Don't Lose Control is a live album by American jazz pianist Don Pullen and saxophonist George Adams recorded in 1979 for the Italian Soul Note label.

Reception
The Allmusic review by Scott Yanow awarded the album 3 stars stating "Tenor saxophonist George Adams and pianist Don Pullen first joined forces in Charles Mingus' band of the 1970s and, upon the great bassist's death, they formed their own dynamic quartet, resulting in many recordings (mostly for European labels). Don't Lose Control, although their fourth record together, was the first to gain much recognition... This set is not quite as essential as some of the Adams-Pullen Quartet's later releases, but worth picking up".

Track listing
All compositions by Don Pullen except where noted.
 "Autumn Song" (George Adams) – 8:57
 "Don't Lose Control" (Adams) – 5:33
 "Remember?" – 5:00
 "Double Arc Jake" – 15:47
 "Places & Faces" (Adams) – 3:30
Recorded at Theatro Ciak in Milano, Italy on November 2 & 3, 1979

Personnel
Don Pullen – piano, vocals
George Adams – tenor saxophone, flute, vocals
Cameron Brown – bass
Dannie Richmond – drums

References

Black Saint/Soul Note live albums
Don Pullen live albums
George Adams (musician) live albums
1979 live albums